Prionia may refer to:

 Prionia, Grevena, an Aromanian village in Greece
 Prionia, a synonym of the moth genus Falcaria